The 2015 Topshelf Open was a tennis tournament played on outdoor grass courts. It was the 26th edition of the Rosmalen Grass Court Championships, and was part of the 250 Series of the 2015 ATP World Tour, and of the WTA International tournaments of the 2015 WTA Tour. Both the men's and the women's events took place at the Autotron park in Rosmalen, 's-Hertogenbosch in the Netherlands, from June 8 through June 14, 2015.

Points and prize money

Point distribution

Prize money

ATP singles main-draw entrants

Seeds

 1 Rankings are as of May 25, 2015.

Other entrants
The following players received wildcards into the main draw:
  Marius Copil
  Robin Haase 
  Lleyton Hewitt

The following players received entry from the qualifying draw:
  Marco Chiudinelli 
  Tatsuma Ito 
  Nicolas Mahut 
  Illya Marchenko

The following player received entry as a lucky loser:
  Kenny de Schepper

Withdrawals
Before the tournament
  Simone Bolelli → replaced by Jürgen Melzer
  Víctor Estrella Burgos → replaced by Ričardas Berankis
  Richard Gasquet → replaced by Marinko Matosevic
  Steve Johnson → replaced by Marsel İlhan
  Nick Kyrgios → replaced by Blaž Kavčič
  Jo-Wilfried Tsonga → replaced by Kenny de Schepper

ATP doubles main-draw entrants

Seeds

1 Rankings are as of May 25, 2015.

Other entrants
The following pairs received wildcards into the doubles main draw:
  Robin Haase /  Benoît Paire
  Lleyton Hewitt /  Matt Reid

Withdrawals
During the tournament
  Matt Reid (right wrist injury)

WTA singles main-draw entrants

Seeds

 1 Rankings are as of May 25, 2015.

Other entrants
The following players received wildcards into the main draw:
  Eugenie Bouchard 
  Océane Dodin
  Michaëlla Krajicek

The following players received entry from the qualifying draw:
  Andrea Hlaváčková
  Jessica Pegula 
  Urszula Radwańska 
  Maria Sanchez

Withdrawals
Before the tournament
  Madison Brengle →replaced by Evgeniya Rodina
  Dominika Cibulková →replaced by Kiki Bertens
  Daria Gavrilova →replaced by Tímea Babos
  Andrea Petkovic →replaced by Tatjana Maria
  Elina Svitolina →replaced by Alison Van Uytvanck

WTA doubles main-draw entrants

Seeds

1 Rankings are as of May 25, 2015.

Other entrants
The following pairs received wildcards into the doubles main draw:
  Eugenie Bouchard /  Lesia Tsurenko
  Indy de Vroome /  Lesley Kerkhove

Withdrawals
During the tournament
  Tímea Babos (viral illness)

Champions

Men's singles

  Nicolas Mahut def.  David Goffin, 7–6(7–1), 6–1

Women's singles

  Camila Giorgi def.  Belinda Bencic, 7–5, 6–3

Men's doubles

  Ivo Karlović /  Łukasz Kubot def.  Pierre-Hugues Herbert /  Nicolas Mahut, 6–2, 7–6(11–9)

Women's doubles

  Asia Muhammad /  Laura Siegemund def.  Jelena Janković /  Anastasia Pavlyuchenkova, 6–3, 7–5

References

External links 
 

Topshelf Open
Topshelf Open
Topshelf Open
Rosmalen Grass Court Championships